The following is a list of albums, EPs, and mixtapes released in 2013. These albums are (1) original, i.e. excluding reissues, remasters, and compilations of previously released recordings, and (2) notable, defined as having received significant coverage from reliable sources independent of the subject.

For additional information about bands formed, reformed, or disbanded, for deaths of musicians, and for links to musical awards, see 2013 in music.

First quarter

January

February

March

Second quarter

April

May

June

Third quarter

July

August

September

Fourth quarter

October

November

December

References

 
Albums
2013